Milady (from my lady) is a French manner of address to a noble woman, the feminine form of milord.

Milady, M'Lady, or similar, may also refer to:

Fictional characters
Milady de Winter, fictional character in Alexandre Dumas, père's d'Artagnan Romances novels
Milady, fictional character in the preschool series 44 Cats
Milady, fictional character in the Italian comic series Milady 3000

Other uses
Milady Tack-Fang (born 1949), Cuban fencer
The Milady Handicap, an American thoroughbred race horse race
Milady, a 1923 French drama film directed by Henri Diamant-Berger
 M'Lady (play), a 1921 British play by Edgar Wallace
 "M'Lady" (Sly and the Family Stone song), a 1968 song by Sly & the Family Stone
M'Lady, a 1974 album by Australian artist Colleen Hewett
"My Lady" (Exo song), a 2013 song by Exo off the album XOXO

See also

 "Panagia Mou, Panagia Mou" (1976 song), song by Mariza Koch for the 1976 Eurovision
 
 Milord (disambiguation)
 Lady (disambiguation)
 MY (disambiguation)
 Mi (disambiguation)